Louis Stirling Edmonds (September 24, 1923 – March 3, 2001) was an American actor from Baton Rouge, Louisiana. He was best known for his roles in Dark Shadows and All My Children.

Edmonds appeared in the musical Ernest in Love in 1960. He acted on the supernatural soap Dark Shadows as Roger Collins  from 1966 to 1971.  His other roles on Dark Shadows were Joshua Collins (the father of Barnabas Collins), Edward Collins (the older brother of Quentin Collins), Roger Collins PT (Roger Collins' opposite self in 1970 Parallel Time), the adult Daniel Collins (a cousin of Barnabas Collins and Millicent Collins' younger brother), Amadeus Collins (a lawyer who was the main prosecutor in the trial of Judah Zachary in 1692, whose spirit later possesses Gerard Stiles in 1840), and Brutus Collins (a ghost who haunted the secret locked room in 1841 Parallel Time).

On All My Children, he played Langley Wallingford/Lenny Wlasuk from 1979-92 (on contract, returning for special events up until 1995, the show's 25th anniversary special), who was married to Phoebe Tyler, portrayed by Ruth Warrick. He received Daytime Emmy nominations in 1984, 1985, and 1986. He also received Soap Opera Digest Award nominations in 1989 and 1990.

Edmonds retired from the show due to ill health after being off contract for several years. He died of respiratory failure on March 3, 2001, in Port Jefferson, New York.

Early life
Edmonds was born in Baton Rouge, Louisiana, on September 24, 1923, to Walter R. Edmonds and his wife, Katherine L. Stirling. He served in the United States Navy during World War II.

Stage work
Edmonds began his career off-Broadway in the 1950s, appearing in mostly light comedy and classical works. He created the role of Algernon in Ernest in Love, the musical version of Oscar Wilde's The Importance of Being Earnest. The cast recording was recently reissued on CD.

He played Max in the original Broadway production of Leonard Bernstein's Candide, but due to a temporary illness, he is not heard on the cast recording. In the 1970s and 1980s Edmonds toured in several national tours; two of the most successful were Man of La Mancha (as Cervantes/Quixote) and My Fair Lady (as Henry Higgins).

Personal life
Edmonds came out publicly in the biography Big Lou by Craig Hamrick, published while Edmonds was in his 70s. The actor gave details of his life as a gay man.

Filmography

References

External links

 
 
 
 
 

1923 births
2001 deaths
American male soap opera actors
American male television actors
American male musical theatre actors
Burials in New York (state)
Deaths from respiratory failure
American gay actors
LGBT people from Louisiana
Male actors from Baton Rouge, Louisiana
20th-century American singers
20th-century American male actors
20th-century American male singers
20th-century American LGBT people